Bosc may refer to:

 Bosc pear, a cultivar of the European Pear
 Bioinformatics Open Source Conference (BOSC), an academic conference
 Gobiosoma bosc, a fish of family Gobiidae

People
 Louis Augustin Guillaume Bosc (1759–1828), French botanist and zoologist
 Ramon Bosc (fl. 1416), Catalan priest and writer in Latin
 Thomas Bosc (born 1983), French rugby league player
 Jean Bosc (1924 - 1973), French cartoonist

See also
 
 BOSC23, a human kidney cell line